Christiansfeld, with a population of 2,977 (1 January 2022), is a town in Kolding Municipality in Southern Jutland in Region of Southern Denmark. The town was founded in 1773 by the Moravian Church and named after the Danish king Christian VII. Since July 2015 it has been a UNESCO World Heritage Site, highlighting its status as the best-preserved example of the town-planning and architecture of the Moravian Church.

Description
The town was constructed around a central Church Square bordered by two parallel streets running east to west. The Hall, Sister's House, fire-house, the vicarage, and the former provost’s house were built directly around the square, and shops, Brother's House, family residences, a hotel, and a school were built along the parallel streets.  Many of the residential buildings are communal, which were typical of Moravian settlements and were used by the widows and unmarried women and men of the congregation. The architecture of Christiansfeld is homogeneous, dominated by one or two-story buildings made out of yellow brick and red tile roofs. Many of the buildings in Christiansfeld retain their original uses.

History
Most of Christiansfeld was constructed in the years 1773–1800, following a strict city plan that drew inspiration from the earlier Moravian settlements of Herrnhaag and Gnadau. To encourage construction, king Christian VII promised a ten-year tax holiday for the city and paid 10% of the construction costs of new houses. By 1779, the town's population reached 279, and by 1782, it had about 400 residents. It was one of many towns in Schleswig officially designated a small market town (flække).

In 1864, Christiansfeld and the rest of Schleswig was ceded to Prussia as a result of Denmark's defeat in the Second Schleswig War. It remained a part of Germany until 1920 when, as a part of a plebiscite called for by the Treaty of Versailles, Northern Schleswig voted to rejoin Denmark. After reunification, the Moravian church lost some of the rights it had obtained as a part of the town's founding in the 18th century. For example, it no longer had the ability to choose the towns leadership, paving the way for the town's first Danish mayor who was not a member of the church in 1920. The church also sold its schools at this time due to the declining membership of its congregation.

From 1970 to 2007, the town was the administrative seat of Christiansfeld Municipality, but it lost this status and was placed in the Kolding Municipality as a part of the Municipal Reform of 2007 (Kommunalreformen 2007).

In 2009 Kolding Municipality and Realdania-foundation agreed on a 100 million DKK restoration project of the inner-city. In 2012 the A.P. Møller og Hustru Chastine Mc-Kinney Møllers Fond donated 60 million DKK for the restoration of the Sister's House.

Today
Today, the city is a tourist attraction: the old city core, the Moravian Church with its light, simple and impressive hall and the special cemetery draw thousands of tourists each year. Its well preserved architecture is one of the reasons it was nominated as a tentative UNESCO World Heritage Site in 1993. It was finally inscribed on the main list on 4 July 2015.

The town is famed for its honey cakes. These are baked to a secret recipe from 1783. Until 2008, the cakes were baked in the original 18th-century bakery, which was then renovated because of new national sanitary standards, but still uses the original recipes.

Notable people 

 Christian David Gebauer (1777–1831) a German-born Danish animal and landscape painter, brought up in Christiansfeld
 Carl Fredrik Kiörboe (1799 in Christiansfeld - 1876) a Danish-born Swedish artist, painted animals
 Johann Christian Gebauer (1808–1884) a Danish composer, organist and music theorist, brought up in Christiansfeld
 Camilla Collett (1813–1895) a Norwegian writer, maybe the first Norwegian feminist, went to school in Christiansfeld
 Samuel Kleinschmidt (1814 in Greenland – 1886) a German/Danish missionary, teacher in Christiansfeld 1837-1841 
 Theodor Brorsen (1819–1895) a Danish astronomer, discovered of five comets; went to school in Christiansfeld
 Carl Bock (1849–1932) a Norwegian government official, author, naturalist and explorer; went to school in Christiansfeld
 Hans Lunding (1899 in Stepping, near Christiansfeld – 1984) military officer and head of the combined army and naval intelligence services; also a bronze medallist in the 1936 Summer Olympics
 Henrik Toft (born 1981 in Christiansfeld) a Danish professional footballer, who currently plays for Kolding BK
 Maya Olesen (born 1991 in Christiansfeld), competitor for Denmark  in Miss World 2011

See also
 Christiansfeld Pharmacy

References

External links

 Official website of the Christiansfeld Centre

Cities and towns in the Region of Southern Denmark
History of the Moravian Church
World Heritage Sites in Denmark
Kolding Municipality